Philippe Quémerais (born 2 July 1971 in Rennes) is a French slalom canoeist who competed in the 1990s and 2000s.

He won two medals in the C2 team event at the ICF Canoe Slalom World Championships with a gold in 2002 and a bronze in 1999. He also has two silvers and two bronzes from the same event from the European Championships.

Quémerais finished fifth in the C2 event at the 2004 Summer Olympics in Athens. His partner in the boat throughout his career was Yann Le Pennec.

His partner in the boat throughout the whole of his career was Yann Le Pennec.

World Cup individual podiums

References

1971 births
Canoeists at the 2004 Summer Olympics
French male canoeists
Living people
Olympic canoeists of France
Sportspeople from Rennes
Medalists at the ICF Canoe Slalom World Championships
21st-century French people